This is a list of the members of the National Executive Committee of the African National Congress who were elected at the 51st national conference in 2002. Most active members were replaced at the 52nd National Conference in 2007.

Composition of the NEC
 Thabo Mbeki - President
 Jacob Zuma - Deputy President
 Mosiuoa Lekota - National Chairperson
 Kgalema Motlanthe - Secretary General
 Sankie Mthembi-Mahanyele - Deputy Secretary General
 Mendi Msimang - Treasurer General
 Nelson Mandela - (Ex Officio)

Additional Members

 Kader Asmal
 Collins Chabane
 Frank Chikane
 Jeremy Cronin
 Phillip Dexter
 Thoko Didiza
 Manne Dipico
 Nkosazana Dlamini-Zuma
 Jessie Duarte
 Ebrahim Ebrahim
 Alec Erwin
 Geraldine Fraser-Moleketi
 Malusi Gigaba
 Frene Ginwala
 Enoch Godongwana
 Derek Hanekom
 Pallo Jordan
 Ronnie Kasrils
 Brigitte Mabandla
 Saki Macozoma
 Penuell Maduna
 Thabang Makwetla
 Trevor Manuel
 Nosiviwe Mapisa-Nqakula
 Beatrice Marshoff
 Amos Masondo
 Ivy Matsepe-Casaburri
 Baleka Mbete
 Membathisi Mdladlana
 Smangaliso Mkhatshwa
 Zweli Mkhize
 Phumzile Mlambo-Ngcuka
 Thandi Modise
 Popo Molefe
 Jabu Moleketi
 Mohammed Valli Moosa
 Thenjiwe Mtintso
 Sydney Mufamadi
 Mavivi Myakayaka-Manzini
 Joel Netshitenzhe
 Smuts Ngonyama
 Charles Nqakula
 Blade Nzimande
 Aziz Pahad
 Essop Pahad
 Naledi Pandor
 Dipuo Peters
 Mathews Phosa
 Jeff Radebe
 Cyril Ramaphosa
 Ngoako Ramatlhodi
 Susan Shabangu
 Lindiwe Sisulu
 Max Sisulu
 Zola Skweyiya
 Manto Tshabalala-Msimang
 Ouma Tsopo
 Tony Yengeni

Ex Officio Members

Gauteng
 David Makhura
 Mbhazima Shilowa

Free State
 Ace Magashule
 Charlotte Lobe

North West
 Supra Mahumapelo
 Edna Molewa

Western Cape
 James Ngculu
 Mcebisi Skwatsha

Mpumalanga
 Lucas Mello

Limpopo
 Cassel Mathale
 Sello Moloto

KwaZulu/Natal
 Sibusiso Ndebele
 Senzo Mchunu

Eastern Cape
 Makhenkesi Stofile
 Humphrey Maxegwana

Northern Cape
 Neville Mompati
 John Block

Women's League
 Bathabile Dlamini

Youth League
 Fikile Mbalula
 Sihle Zikalala

Observers

   1. Ngconde Balfour
   2. Nosimo Balindlela
   3. Jean Benjamin
   4. Ntombazana Botha
   5. Rob Davies
   6. Johnny De Lange
   7. Dirk du Toit
   8. Mluleki George
   9. Cheryl Gillwald
  10. Mbulelo Goniwe
  11. Nomatyala Hangana
  12. Lindiwe Hendricks
  13. Peggy Hollander
  14. John Jeffery
  15. Joyce Mabudafhasi
  16. M. J. Mahlangu

	

  15. Gwen Mahlangu
  16. Vytjie Mentor
  17. Dorothy Motubatse
  18. Mandisi Mpahlwa
  19. Andries Nel
  20. Gert Oosthuizen
  21. Roy Padayachie
  22. Ebrahim Rasool
  23. Nozizwe Routledge-Madlala
  24. Buyelwa Sonjica
  25. Enver Surty
  26. Elizabeth Thabethe
  27. Sue Van der Merwe
  28. Victor Vusumuzi Windvoel
  29. Lulama Xingwana
  30. Marthinus van Schalkwyk

External links
 List of 2002-2007 NEC members

List
ANC